Erik Frisell (3 May 1889 – 17 December 1944) was a Swedish track and field athlete who competed in the 1912 Summer Olympics. In 1912 he was eliminated in the first round of the 800 metres competition.

References

1889 births
1944 deaths
Swedish male middle-distance runners
Olympic athletes of Sweden
Athletes (track and field) at the 1912 Summer Olympics